Maraylya is a suburb of Sydney, in the state of New South Wales, Australia. Maraylya is bounded in the north and the east by Cattai Creek. The western part of Maraylya is prone to flooding after heavy rains, particularly from run-off from the Scheyville National Park. The flood waters make their way to Longneck Lagoon, which eventually drains into the Hawkesbury River less than 2 km to the west. Maraylya consists mainly of small-acreage properties used as hobby farms and for keeping horses for recreational purposes. Scheyville National Park adjoins the southern border of Maraylya and is popular for horse trail rides for local residents. There is an arena in the area called the Horseworld Sportsworld Equestrian Stadium.

In July 2020, a small section of Maraylya in the south was carved out and formed the new suburb of Gables.

References 

Suburbs of Sydney
City of Hawkesbury
Hawkesbury River
The Hills Shire